Company was a monthly fashion, celebrity and lifestyle magazine published in the United Kingdom from 1978.

History and profile
The magazine was started in 1978. It celebrated its 30th birthday in 2008, and in that time has had only six editors: Maggie Goodman, Gil Hudson, Mandi Norwood, Fiona Macintosh, Sam Baker, and the current editor, Victoria White. The magazine was published on a monthly basis and generally featured celebrities on its covers.

In 2014, the magazine moved online-only. Its last print edition was published in October 2014. The magazines website address www.company.co.uk now redirects to that of Cosmopolitan magazine.

Association with Britain's Next Top Model
The winner of Britain's Next Top Model was awarded the cover as well as a six-page editorial with Company. Currently, there have been seven such winners: Lianna Fowler, Lauren McAvoy, Alex Evans, Mecia Simson, Tiffany Pisani, Jade Thompson, Letitia Herod and Lauren Lambert.

References

External links
Official website

1978 establishments in the United Kingdom
2014 disestablishments in the United Kingdom
Defunct magazines published in the United Kingdom
Fashion magazines published in the United Kingdom
Lifestyle magazines published in the United Kingdom
Magazines disestablished in 2014
Magazines established in 1978
Monthly magazines published in the United Kingdom
Online magazines published in the United Kingdom
Online magazines with defunct print editions